Man Wa Lane (Chinese: 文華里), also commonly known as Chop Alley (圖章街), is a lane in Sheung Wan, Hong Kong, spanning from Bonham Strand to Connaught Road Central, across Wing Lok Street and Des Voeux Road Central.

Man Wa Lane is famous for stalls of chop-makers.  The chops range from traditional Chinese seals to modern rubber stamps.  Some stalls also offer services to print various cards.

See also
 List of streets and roads in Hong Kong

References

Roads on Hong Kong Island
Sheung Wan